The men's halfpipe competition of the Nagano 1998 Olympics was held at Kanbayashi Snowboard Park.

Results

Qualifying

Round 1
The top eight automatically qualified for the final.

Round 2
The top eight finishers qualified for the final.

Final

The 16 finalists each competed in two runs, with the total score counting for ranking.

References 

Men's Halfpipe
Men's events at the 1998 Winter Olympics